Jean-Joseph Roux (Marseille, 1769 — Odessa, 1817) was a French privateer.

Career 
Roux became captain in 1809. He captained ships in six commerce raiding cruises: three on Jean Bart, one on Payan-Latour, and two on Babiole, totalling 21 prizes.

Citations and references

References
 
 

1769 births
1817 deaths
People of the Quasi-War
French privateers
Military personnel from Marseille
French military personnel of the Napoleonic Wars